Microsoft Power Fx is a free and open source low-code, general-purpose programming language for expressing logic across the Microsoft Power Platform.

It was first announced at Ignite 2021 and the specification was released in March 2021. It is based on spreadsheet-like formulas to make it accessible to large numbers of people. It was also influenced by programming languages and tools like Pascal, Mathematica, and Miranda.

As Microsoft describes the language, it heavily borrows from the spreadsheet paradigm. In a spreadsheet, cells can contain formulas referring to the contents of other cells; if the user changes the content of a cell, the values of all its dependent cells are automatically updated. In a similar fashion, the properties of components in a Power Fx program are connected by formulas (whose syntax is very reminiscent of Excel) and their values are automatically updated if changes occur. For instance, a simple formula may connect a component's color property to the value of a slider component; if the user moves the slider, the color changes.

Power Fx was developed by a Microsoft team led by Vijay Mital, Robin Abraham, Shon Katzenberger and Darryl Rubin. Power Fx is available as Open-source software. The source code was shared under MIT license by Microsoft on November 2. 2021. Only the documentation was originally open source.

See also

Visual Basic for Applications
List of low-code development platforms
List of programming languages
Timeline of programming languages

References

External links

Introducing Microsoft Power Fx: the low-code programming language for everyone
What is Microsoft Power Fx?

Microsoft development tools
Microsoft free software
Power Fx
Declarative programming languages
Functional languages
Multi-paradigm programming languages
Programming languages created in 2021
Software using the MIT license
2021 software